Ignacy Łempicki may refer to:

 Ignacy Łempicki (18th century) – major general of the Army of the Crown of the Polish Kingdom
 Ignacy Łempicki (1766–?) – chargé d'affaires of the Polish–Lithuanian Commonwealth in Vienna
 Ignacy Łempicki (1801–1876) – military officer in the November uprising